Ostheldera is a genus of moths of the family Noctuidae.

Species
 Ostheldera arne L. Ronkay & Z. Varga, 1994
 Ostheldera minna L. Ronkay & Z. Varga, 1994
 Ostheldera persa L. Ronkay & Z. Varga, 1994

References
 Natural History Museum Lepidoptera genus database
 

Cuculliinae